is a Japanese skateboarder. She won a silver medal in the women's park event at the 2020 Tokyo Olympics, becoming the youngest Japanese athlete on record to participate in the Summer Olympic Games.

Career 
Hiraki has competed in women's park events at several World Skateboarding Championships, finishing seventh in 2018 and 11th in 2019. She has also competed at X Games, winning silver in 2019 in Boise, Idaho, US.

She finished first in 2019 Vans Park Series, Paris. She finished fifth at the 2021 Dew Tour Des Moines, qualifying for the 2020 Summer Olympics.

References

External links
 
 Kokona Hiraki at The Boardr

Living people
2008 births
Female skateboarders
Japanese skateboarders
Japanese sportswomen
Olympic skateboarders of Japan
Skateboarders at the 2020 Summer Olympics
Sportspeople from Hokkaido
X Games athletes
Medalists at the 2020 Summer Olympics
Olympic medalists in skateboarding
Olympic silver medalists for Japan
21st-century Japanese women